Reed Creek Mill is a historic grist mill at 1565 South Church Street in Wytheville, Virginia.  The property includes a c. 1902 wood-frame mill building, a  mill dam and raceway, and a c. 1950 storage building.  The site has seen industrial use as a mill since 1858; its first mill was torn down late in the 19th century.  The present mill building served the local agricultural community until 2004, and has since undergone restoration.

The mill was listed on the National Register of Historic Places in 2016.

The mill is privately owned and not open to the public.

See also
National Register of Historic Places listings in Wythe County, Virginia

References

Grinding mills in Virginia
Grinding mills on the National Register of Historic Places in Virginia
Victorian architecture in Virginia
Industrial buildings completed in 1902
Buildings and structures in Wythe County, Virginia
National Register of Historic Places in Wythe County, Virginia